Sotnia (Ukrainian and ) was a military unit and administrative division in many Slavic countries. 

Sotnia, deriving back to 1948, has been used in a variety of contexts in both Ukraine and Russia to this day. It is a helpful word to create short names for groups including the Nebesna Sotnia and Terek Wolf Sotnia, stating that these groups do include 100-150 persons.

The military unit analog and most meaningful translation for the English-speaking world would be a company.

Its significance can be notice its nationalist impact within the 16th-18th century Cossacks Ukrainian People’s Republic, Ukrainian National Army, and during Euromaidan.

Sotnia can also be referred to as half-sotnia which is a more diminutive unit of people. This typically consists of around 50 people.

In Russian history,  was also a unit of some other (civil) organizations, see Сотня.

History and application

Cossacks
As a unit of the Cossack regiments, it is known from the earliest records of the Zaporizhian Sich.

During the Cossack service in the Imperial Russian Armies the typical regiment had five  or squadrons. The term was used in the context of Cossack foot or cavalry regiments. The unit term was retained until the establishment of Soviet Union in 1922 and termination of the Ukrainian People's Republic and Free Don Cossack Oblast.

Established by the cossacks the word Kurin was being associated in their military dictionary. By the Second World War the word burin was commonly used alongside Sotnia. It was a term referring to the basic combat unit of the Ukrainian Insurgent Army (UPA), the world Kurin means a village. These villages were equivalent to a battalion around four to eight hundred member each divided into three to four sotnias.

Cossacks: Don Cossacks
In 1906, Russia faced eighteen months of revolutionary turmoil. The Cossacks played a large role in becoming one of the most feared defenders. Discontent steadily merged late that summer, causing an increase in unrest for workers and peasants within the Russian Empire. Between May and August, fifteen Don Cossacks units mutinied.

Cossacks of the second Sotnia carried out a large group of numbers in meetings to avoid dispersing the mob. Several meetings were made and a report was made listing other incidents of the same regiment. Concluding that all the Cossacks of the Taganrog have been seen as unreliable.

Cosscaks started an internal police service. They depicted themselves a heroic warriors and defender of the fatherland. The group carried out many terrorist operations. Cossacks would break up in smaller units, referring to half-sotnias. They used campaigns that were unparalleled in its brutality and scope, the morale of the cossacks became to decrease.

Sotnia Cavalry 
In the mid-1980s, Russia, Germany, Austria, and France worked together to create peace, with 1,772 squadrons and sotnias of Cavalry. They increased the numbers higher. A large amount of numbers of cavalry, became the most expensive if all arms, and the weighty on the badgers of each country. Sotnia calvary can also refer to the animals the soldiers who rode horseback, in military context.

Ukrainian National Army
In the Ukrainian National Army (fighting as part of the armed forces of Nazi Germany at the end of World War II), each  contained three or four  (singular) and each  comprised three  (singular  [Ukrainian], literally "a swarm"; a section or reinforced squad of 10 to 12 men). Every  usually had one light machine gun, two or three other special weapons, and at least seven assault rifles.

Nebesna Sotnia (Heavenly Hundred) 
In the wake of the 2014 invasion of Ukraine by Russia, which killed around 20,000 Ukrainians, the Ukrainian heroes became known as the “Heavenly Hundred” (Ukrainian: Nebesna Sotnia). Nebesna being defined as heavenly, in the sense that there is a link with Heaven or God. Sotnia defined as hundreds, refers back to the military units established by Cossacks. Heavenly Hundred can be understood as the “legion of those who went to heaven” or “the legion of those who went to God”.

Fall of 2013, Ukraine marked the day 20 February around the world, the Day of Commemoration of the Heroes of the Heavenly Hundred. Ukrainians protested on the streets against the corrupt authoritarian regime of Viktor Yanukovych, who was the former president. This was a movement that soon became names as the Revolution of Dignity. Ukrainians in all cities and town came together to ruse up in defence of their inalienable rights. Wanting a new rule of law and democracy for the country/ Demanding the government to produce them with both dignity and human rights that they all deserve 

Throughout the years, everyone from around the world are reminded of the principles and values which the Ukrainians had to pay for and continue to pay with their own lives, dignity, democracy, equality and rule of the law. The Revolution of Dignity, has become a turning point in modern Ukraine history, it has now become recognised throughout the world as expression of the ideal of national freedom.

Zhinocha Sotnia (Women's Squad)

Between 2013 and 2014 Ukrainian women and males were able to both equally participate at Kyiv's Maidan Nezalezhnosti protesting for their rights. However, women were excluded from the more violent activities, where their contributions became largely unknowable. By 2014, Nadia Parfan organised and created a “Night of Women’s Solidarity” leading a group of feminists to Maidan. Dissatfication grew amongst the women protest and the continued exclusion for the Maiden square grew a new phenomenon known as the “Women's Squad” (Zhinocha Sotnia), an all-women self-defense brigade. The translation is “Women's Hundred”, this use of “hundred” is referred to a common grouping of soldiers into squads of hundred.

Women would protest feminist initiatives and discussions about their role in Ukraine’s past and future, which explored both nationalism and military contexts. The Maidan created a place where women were able to protest and be herd in a public space. Provided Ukraine’s feminists with brand new opportunities to articulate divergent and familiar outlooks on women's lives through activism, social change and national sovereignty.

Terek Wolf Sotnia 

Russian nationalism and Russian Monarchism has been increasing since the fall of the Soviet Union. By April 2014, Russian Special Forces were operating in Ukraine to destabilise the country. These were known as the Terek Wolf Sotnia, is a group of members who have been identified as mysterious and ideologically questionable. Their profiles can be identified seen as V shape insignia of black green and red tricolor. Including ahead of a wolf in front. The disguised men appear to be Russian citizens, however others claim to be natives of Crimea or from Eastern Ukraine. These men all share similar commonalities, claiming to be Fascist and ultra-nationalist, claiming to defend Eastern Ukraine from Fascist operating in the Ukraine.

Tikhon karetniy is a Russian member of the Belorechensk Cossack community. Photos were posted to the community showing his involvement in the seizures in Solviansk also known as the “Terek Wolf Sotnia”.

References

Military of the Russian Empire
Zaporizhian Sich
Cossack military units and formations
Military of Croatia
Military units and formations of Ukraine
Military history of Ukraine